Oleksandr Serhiyovych Klymets (born 14 February 2000) is a Ukrainian professional footballer who plays as a left midfielder for Ukrainian club Volyn Lutsk.

References

External links
 Profile on Volyn Lutsk official website
 

2000 births
Living people
Place of birth missing (living people)
Ukrainian footballers
Association football midfielders
FC Volyn Lutsk players
Ukrainian First League players
Ukrainian Second League players